Inis Rath is an island located in Lough Erne, in County Fermanagh, Northern Ireland.  It is also known as Hare Krishna Island.

The main building on the island is a Victorian mansion, built by Cavendish Butler. It was later sold to Lord Erne and became a hunting lodge.  

In 1982 a group of Hare Krishna monks bought Inis Rath and converted the house into a Hare Krishna centre. An ISKCON temple was created in the west wing.

Inis Rath has a 22-acre nature reserve which is open to the public. However, they are requested not to eat meat, smoke or drink alcohol while on the island. The only visitor amenities are an eco-friendly toilet block and a free ferry service, which operates on Sundays.

References

Lake islands of Northern Ireland
International Society for Krishna Consciousness temples
Islands of County Fermanagh